Fiona Freckleton (born 6 November 1960) is a British rower. She competed in the women's eight event at the 1992 Summer Olympics. 

Freckleton is a bronze medalist in the Women's Pairs at the 1991 World Rowing Championships in Vienna, Great Britain's first medal in a major World Championship women's rowing event. She also competed at the 1993 World Rowing Championships.

Freckleton studied at Somerville College, Oxford.

References

External links
 

1960 births
Living people
British female rowers
Olympic rowers of Great Britain
Rowers at the 1992 Summer Olympics
Sportspeople from Chelmsford
Alumni of Somerville College, Oxford